Anger is a municipality in the district of Berchtesgadener Land in Bavaria in Germany. The low peaks Högl and Johannishögl are within the municipality.

Notable people 
The German ski mountaineers Stefanie Koch and Stefan Klinger were born in Anger.

References

Berchtesgadener Land